is a Japanese footballer who plays for Tokushima Vortis.

Career
After attending Sanno Institute of Management, Hamashita joined Tochigi SC in December 2017. At the end of 2019, he signed with Tokushima Vortis.

Club statistics
Updated to end of 2018 season.

References

External links

Profile at J. League
Profile at Tochigi SC

1995 births
Living people
Sanno Institute of Management alumni
Association football people from Hiroshima Prefecture
Japanese footballers
J2 League players
Sanfrecce Hiroshima players
Tochigi SC players
Tokushima Vortis players
Association football midfielders